Janko Đurđević (c. 1770 – 1828) was a representative of the Smederevo nahiyah in the cabinets of Matija Nenadović, Mladen Milovanović, and Jakov Nenadović. He was a member of the Great Federal Court (Supreme Court) from 1811.

Biography
Janko Đurđević was born around 1770 in Konjska Reka, near Bajina Bašta, Serbia, at a time when, during Karađorđe's Serbia, it was part of the Danube principality of the Smederevo nahija. He was a legal advisor during the time of Karađorđe. In 1813, he fled to Austria and then emigrated to Imperial Russia where he died in 1828.

His contemporaries, Vuk Karadžić, Matija Nenadović, and Lazar Arsenijević mention him in their respective memoirs.

His son Paun Janković (1808-1865) was acting Prime Minister of Serbia in 1840.

Sources
 Milan Đ. Milićević, Pomenik znamenitih ljudi u srpskog narodu novijega doba, Vol 1 (Belgrade, 1888)
 Milan Đ. Milićević,Kneževina Srbija (Belgrade, 1878)
 Lazar Arsenijević Batalaka, Istorija srpskog ustanka (Belgrade, 1898)
 Konstantin N. Nenadović, Život i dela velikog Đorđa Petrovića Kara Đorđa Vrhovnog Vožda... (Vienna, 1884)

References 

1700s births
1828 deaths
Year of birth uncertain
Ottoman Serbia